The 2008 MTV Movie Awards was the 17th annual movie awards show and was broadcast live on Sunday, June 1, at the Gibson Amphitheatre in Universal City, California. The ceremonies were hosted by Mike Myers.

Performers
Coldplay — "Viva la Vida"
The Pussycat Dolls — "When I Grow Up"
 Adam Sandler - "Nobody Does It Better" (with part of the guitar solo from Pink Floyd's "Mother"). (Honoring his MTV Generation Award, with modified lyrics. This version can also be found on the 2016 digital compilation Cover Bond: Great Music Artists Performing The Songs from Every James Bond Movie.)

Presenters
Will Smith, Charlize Theron, and Jason Bateman — presented Best Female Performance
Will Ferrell and Danny McBride — presented Best Fight
Edward Norton and Liv Tyler — introduced Coldplay
Seth Rogen and James Franco — presented Best Summer Movie so Far
Jennifer Hudson and Sarah Jessica Parker — presented Best Male Performance
Steve Carell, Dwayne Johnson, and Anne Hathaway — presented Best Comedic Performance
Tom Cruise — presented the MTV Generation Award, introduced Adam Sandler
P. Diddy, Lindsay Lohan, and Verne Troyer — presented Breakthrough Performance
Brendan Fraser — presented Best Villain
Katharine McPhee, Anna Faris, Rumer Willis and Emma Stone — introduced the Pussycat Dolls
Megan Fox and Rainn Wilson — presented Best Kiss
Ben Stiller, Jack Black, and Robert Downey Jr. — presented Best Movie

Awards

MTV Generation Award
 Adam Sandler

Notes

References

External links 
 MTV Movie Awards official site

MTV Movie & TV Awards
Mtv Movie Awards
MTV Movie
2008 in Los Angeles
2007 in American cinema